Cannabis in Switzerland is illegal, though minor possession was decriminalized to a fine in 2012. Several cantons began to allow adults to cultivate and use cannabis in 2012, but this was struck down by federal courts. In 2016, four cities stated they were looking into establishing pilot cannabis clubs. The number of cannabis users in Switzerland is estimated to be around 500,000 among a population of 8 million.

Classification
Cannabis that contains more than 1.0% THC is classified as an illegal drug in Switzerland.  Thus, according to the Federal Law on Drugs: the production, culture, use, and possession of cannabis, are all prohibited and considered as criminal infringements. These infringements are punishable by up to three years of imprisonment and/or a fine. 

Since 2017, legal cannabis, also known as "low-THC weed", with less than 1.0% of THC is sold at nearly every tobacco store. In March 2019, a Swiss Federal Administrative Court upheld the taxation scheme by customs officials, which impose a tax of CHF38 ($37.70) per kilo as well as 25% of the retail revenue.

Medical use
Currently only one narcotic cannabis drug preparation is officially approved for medical use in Switzerland.  However, with the adoption of a revision in the Federal Act on Narcotics and Psychotropic Substances (NarcA), accepted by popular vote in 2008, and in effect since 2011, Swiss physicians can obtain a special permit from the Federal Office of Public Health for their patients with the allowance to prescribe medical cannabis for 12 months. Only two pharmacies in the country are permitted to dispense cannabis tinctures and cannabis oil concentrates for patients with serious or terminal illnesses. Treatment options with cannabis flower or cannabis resin are not available.

An official cannabidiol preparation (Epidiolex) for rare forms of epilepsy was approved by the FDA in June 2018, and by the European Medicines Agency in September 2019. Since then, Swiss pharmacies are allowed to prepare and dispense medicinal products containing cannabidiol as a magistral formulation and prescription drug (not subject to the Narcotics Act), in accordance with current German Drug Codex DAC/NRF and Swiss pharmacopeial standards.

Reform attempts
In 2001, the Swiss federal council committed to implement changes as to decriminalization of personal use and possession, and the Parliament was tasked to tender concrete approaches.

An attempt to decriminalize possession and consumption of cannabis failed narrowly in Parliament in 2004. As a reaction, a popular initiative ("Eidgenössische Volksinitiative für eine vernünftige Hanf-Politik mit wirksamem Jugendschutz") to amend the constitution to legalize cannabis was introduced 2004. 

A referendum was launched in 2008. Results from the November 2008 referendum showed 36.7% of those voting supported legalizing cannabis.

Decriminalization
Since 28 September 2012, the possession of less than 10 grams of cannabis is no longer a criminal infringement, but is still punished by a 100 Swiss francs flat fine. Professional cannabis trade, as well as the possession of a quantity of cannabis that can affect the health of a large number of people (4 kg of hashish, according to the Federal Court), are punished by one to three years of imprisonment that can be augmented with a fine.

In September 2017, the federal court ruled that the flat fine for the sole possession of small amounts has been wrongly inflicted since 2013. Only the consumption of cannabis can be fined. As a consequence, most cantonal police departments changed their policy towards stopping the prosecution of small amounts of cannabis, while others had already done so earlier. However, the cantons of Geneva, Vaud, Valais, Neuchâtel, Jura, Ticino, St. Gallen and both Appenzell still retain their old policy.

Canton legalization and reversal
On 5 October 2012, the Federal Court invalidated the agreement on hemp culture and trading that came into force on 1 January 2012, which allowed private citizens in the cantons of Geneva, Freiburg, Valais, Vaud, Neuchâtel, Basel-Stadt and Ticino to grow up to four hemp plants (containing less than 1.0% of THC), for violating the federal law on drugs.

Renewed legalization attempts 
On 11 September 2018, a parliamentary initiative by the Green Party, that demanded a law on regulation of cultivation, trade, recreational consumption, youth protection, and taxing of cannabis, was rejected in the National Council by 104 to 86 votes. Meanwhile the "Legalize It" organization is preparing a second popular initiative originally set to launch in April 2018.

Pilot trials

In 2016, the cities of Geneva, Basel, Bern, and Zürich stated that they planned to establish pilot cannabis clubs to gauge their utility, limited to 2,000 members total and to be studied for four years. Those pilot projects have been shut down by the Federal Office of Public Health in November 2017 because of a missing legal basis. In December 2017, an absolute majority of members of both parliamentary chambers signed a parliamentary motion to change the law. However, in June 2018, the motion was narrowly rejected by the National Council after it had passed the Council of States. In July 2018, the Federal Council sent a proposition for future cannabis studies to the parliament anyway.

On 25 September 2020, Swiss parliament approved an amendment to the Federal Act on Narcotics and Psychotropic Substances (NarcA), which came into effect on 15 May 2021. The amendment provides the legal basis for scientific trials with selected groups of recreational cannabis users residing in Switzerland, and establishes a federally regulated cultivation and harvesting process for narcotic cannabis with dosage/potency limitations (20% THC), limits for pesticide residues, and warning label requirements. Additives to cannabis products will also have to undergo federal approval, and need to be declared. Federal ordinances will remain in effect for 10 years, determining the individual criteria for trial participants, and regulating the national production and trade of psychotropic cannabis (made in Switzerland).

A number of larger Swiss cities and municipalities have expressed interest to participate in those trials, but will have to prove first that recreational cannabis is not negatively affecting the well-being of the general population. Starting in 2022, approved Swiss cannabis users will have the opportunity to obtain cannabis at local pharmacies under these strict regulations set forth by the Federal Office of Public Health (FOPH).

The FOPH has authorized April 19, 2022 the first pilot test of an adult buyer program for recreational use of cannabis in Basel in northern Switzerland. This is expected to provide data on the way forward to regulate purchasing and consumption of recreationally used cannabis 
The program is expected to last 2 years and will include 400 adult volunteers who are to have their state of health monitored constantly. The program 6 years in development was held up for legal reasons but the narcotics law was changed in 2021 and in August of that year was allowed to move forward.
Four cannabis strains will be made available also 2 strains of hash will be available to approved volunteers in 10 pharmacies in Basel, produced by Pure Holding A.G.
Participants of the program are to be warned not to share their cannabis with non-participants or they might be taken out of the trial program.  Originally scheduled to begin in September 2022, the "Weed Care" program started on 31 January 2023 with the possibility for a first half of the 374 participants to buy cannabis legally. The study will last until March 2025 at least.

In October 2021, a parliamentary commission ruled cannabis should no longer be banned and Switzerland is going to draw up a draft law for the legalisation of cannabis "for better youth and consumer protection”.

Penalties
The penalties imposed in practice also vary among cantons to a certain degree. The 2007 penalty guidelines adopted by the Bernese Judges' Association provide as follows:

See also
 The Association of Swiss Hemp Friends

References

 
Society of Switzerland